Take One is the non-official debut studio album by American singer and American Idol season eight runner-up Adam Lambert, consisting of pre-Idol recordings Lambert made while working as a session musician, but released post-Idol. It was released on November 17, 2009. The album had sold 48,000 copies in the United States.

Album information
This album is a collection of recordings Lambert made in 2005 while working as a session musician. Take One was released in the same month as his post-Idol debut, For Your Entertainment.

Lambert issued a statement through 19 Entertainment stating, "Back in 2005 when I was a struggling artist, I was hired as a studio singer to lend my vocals to tracks written by someone else. I was broke at the time and this was my chance to make a few bucks, so I jumped at the opportunity to record for my first time in a professional studio. The work I did back then in no way reflects the music I am currently in the studio working on."

Critical reception

Critical response to Take One has been mixed. Allmusic said that "The songs aren’t horrible but they’re not memorable and neither are Lambert’s performances, but that’s unfair to him: these recordings were designed to sell middle-of-the-road pop with commercial aspirations and have absolutely no room for flair, since the whole point is to showcase the lyric and melody. Lambert acquits himself in that regard, sounding like nothing more than a demo singer because that was, after all, what he was".

Track listing

Personnel
 Malcolm Welsford – producer, engineer, mixing
 John Armstrong – assistant engineer
 Mark Endert – additional production
 Bernie Grundman – mastering
 Adam Lambert – vocals
 Marcus Brown – bass, keyboards
 Stuart Pearce – arranger
 Monte Pittman – guitar
 Steve Sidelnyk – drums
 Emma Bogren – images, graphics

Chart performance

Release history

External links
Adam Lambert Official site

References

2009 albums
Adam Lambert albums
Demo albums